Domonic Paul William Bedggood (born 18 September 1994) is an Australian diver. He was a gold medallist at the 2014 and 2018 Commonwealth Games.

Background
Bedggood was born on 18 September 1994 in Southport, a suburb of Queensland's Gold Coast. He was originally a gymnast but turned to diving after breaking his back in a high bar routine gone wrong. Bedggood started diving at the age of sixteen. He trains at the Brisbane Aquatic Centre.

Career
At the 2014 Commonwealth Games in Glasgow, Scotland, he won the Men's Synchronised 10m platform with Matthew Mitcham. At the 2015 World Aquatics Championships in Kazan, Russia, he teamed with Melissa Wu to win a bronze medal in the Mixed 10m Synchronised.

At the 2018 Commonwealth Games on the Gold Coast, Queensland, Bedggood won a gold medal in the Men's 10m platform and bronze medals in the Men's 3m Synchronized (with Matthew Carter) and the Men's 10m Synchronized (alongside Dec Stacey).

On the second day of diving competition at the 2022 Commonwealth Games, held in Birmingham, England, Bedggood won a bronze medal in the 10 metre synchronized platform with partner Cassiel Rousseau, scoring 412.56 points to finish less than 18 points behind the gold medal duo from England and less than 2 points behind the silver medal duo from Canada.

References

External links
 
 
 
 
 
 
 
 
 

1994 births
Living people
Australian male divers
Olympic divers of Australia
Divers at the 2016 Summer Olympics
Commonwealth Games medallists in diving
Commonwealth Games gold medallists for Australia
Commonwealth Games bronze medallists for Australia
Divers at the 2014 Commonwealth Games
Divers at the 2018 Commonwealth Games
Divers at the 2022 Commonwealth Games
World Aquatics Championships medalists in diving
Sportspeople from the Gold Coast, Queensland
20th-century Australian people
21st-century Australian people
Medallists at the 2014 Commonwealth Games
Medallists at the 2018 Commonwealth Games
Medallists at the 2022 Commonwealth Games